is a Japanese shōjo manga artist born in Hakodate, Hokkaido, Japan. She made her professional debut in 1978 with Kotchi muite Marie!! in the weekly Shōjo Comic, for which she won a Shogakukan New Artist Award. She is best known in the United States as the author of Dolls, which was licensed by Viz Media.

References

External links
 Yumiko Kawahara manga at Media Arts Database 
 Profile  at The Ultimate Manga Guide
 Yumiko Kawahara fansite 

1960 births
People from Hakodate
Japanese female comics artists
Women manga artists
Female comics writers
Living people
Manga artists from Hokkaido
Japanese women writers